The 1885–86 Irish Cup was the sixth edition of the premier knock-out cup competition in Irish football.

Distillery won the tournament for the third time and third year in a row, defeating Limavady 1–0 in a repeat of the previous year's final.

Results

First round

|}

1After a protest by YMCA that the match did not kick off at the correct time, a replay was ordered.

Replays

|}

1 After protesting against Moyola Park's rough play in the previous match, Magherafelt refused to play the replay.
2 After both teams drew again, they were moved into the second round.

Second round

|}

Replay

|}

Third round

|}

Fourth round

|}

Semi-finals

|}

Final

References

External links
 Northern Ireland Cup Finals. Rec.Sport.Soccer Statistics Foundation (RSSSF)

Irish Cup seasons
1885–86 domestic association football cups
1885–86 in Irish association football